A saggar (also misspelled as sagger or segger) is a type of kiln furniture. It is a ceramic boxlike container used in the firing of pottery to enclose or protect ware being fired inside a kiln. The name may be a contraction of the word safeguard.

Saggars are still used in the production of ceramics to shield ware from the direct contact of flames and from damage by kiln debris. 

Traditionally, saggars were made primarily from fireclay. Saggars have been used to protect, or safeguard, ware from open flame, smoke, gases and kiln debris: Modern saggars are made of alumina ceramic, cordierite ceramic, mullite ceramic silicon carbide and in special cases from zirconia.

Ming porcelain
The manufacturer of saggars in the fifteenth and sixteenth centuries occupied a large proportion of space, labour and material (fuel and clay) at the imperial manufactury, and there were more kilns devoted to creating them than to firing the final product.

Staffordshire potbanks
By far the largest number of UK pottery manufacturers were based in and around Stoke-on-Trent in a region known as The Potteries. Their businesses, locally known as potbanks, fired their wares in distinctive bottle ovens. At the turn of the twentieth century over 4,000 of these were in use, although by 2014 only 47 survive, all of which are no longer in production but are listed buildings.

The saggars were used for the biscuit and the glost firing. They were expected to last for about 40 firings; each potbank made their own in a saggar making workshop. Saggars were made from fireclay, by a saggar maker and two assistants: the framemaker and the bottom knocker. The framemaker beat the clay into a sheet on a metal table using a large mallet, the mow or mawl. Using a frame he would cut it to size, sprinkle it with sawdust and wrap it around a wooden block to make the walls. The framemaker was usually an apprentice in his late teens. The bottom knocker, usually a boy in his early teens, did the same on a smaller scale, constructing the round or banjo-shaped bottom. Again the mow was used to beat the air out of the clay and flatten the sheet. The saggar maker was an experienced craftsman who paid his assistants out of his piece-work earnings: he took the bottom and the sides onto a wheel and using his thumbs joined the sides to the bottom. The green saggars were dried and then placed on the top of bungs during the next firing of the kiln.

The unfired ceramic ware was placed in saggars and then biscuit fired, before being glazed and again placed in saggars prior to being glost fired. Ware may then be decorated, and placed on refractory bats and fired again such as in a muffle kiln.

A saggar maker's bottom knocker  was a job title considered sufficiently amusing for it to be featured on the television panel show What's My Line?. Whilst saggar making was a skilled craft, bottom knocking was far less skilled, consisting of beating clay into a metal ring.

Studio pottery
From the twentieth century studio potters have used saggars to create decorative ceramic pieces. In this use saggars are used to create a localised reducing atmosphere, or concentrate the effects of salts, metal oxides and other materials on the surface of their ware.

Some pots may be carefully prepared for saggar firing. One method creates a smooth surface covered with clay slip, terra sigillata, which responds particularly well to the saggar technique. This slip covering may be burnished to achieve a gloss. Prepared pots are nestled into saggars filled with beds of combustible materials, such as sawdust, less combustible organic materials, salts and metals. These materials ignite or fume during firing, leaving the pot buried in layers of fine ash.  Ware produced in filled saggars may display dramatic markings, with colours ranging from distinctive black and white markings to flashes of golds, greens and red tones. Porcelain and stoneware are ideal for displaying the surface patterns obtained through saggar firing. In addition to the use of saggars, some studio potters bundle pots and burnable materials within a heavy wrapping of metal foil.

Saggar clay
Saggar clay is a course grained fire clay which gets its name from the saggars which it is used to make.

References

 Hamer, Frank and Janet. The Potter's Dictionary of Materials and Techniques. A & C Black Publishers, Limited, London, England, Third Edition 1991. .
 Watkins, James C., Alternative Kilns & Firing Techniques: Raku * Saggar * Pit * Barrel,  Lark Ceramics Publications, 2007.  , .

External links
Potbank Dictionary Archived for the British Library.

Pottery